The Temple Warning inscription, also known as the Temple Balustrade inscription or the Soreg inscription, is an inscription that hung along the balustrade outside the Sanctuary of the Second Temple in Jerusalem. Two of these tablets have been found. The inscription was a warning to pagan visitors to the temple not to proceed further. Both Greek and Latin inscriptions on the temple's balustrade served as warnings to pagan visitors not to proceed under penalty of death. 

A complete tablet was discovered in 1871 by Charles Simon Clermont-Ganneau, in the ad-Dawadariya school just outside the al-Atim Gate to the Temple Mount, and published by the Palestine Exploration Fund. Following the discovery of the inscription, it was taken by the Ottoman authorities, and it is currently in the Istanbul Archaeology Museums. A partial fragment of a less well made version of the inscription was found in 1936 by J. H. Iliffe during the excavation of a new road outside Jerusalem's Lions' Gate; it is held in the Israel Museum.

Inscription
Two authentic tablets have been found, one complete, and the other a partial fragment with missing sections, but with letters showing signs of the red paint that had originally highlighted the text. It was described by the Palestine Exploration Fund in 1872 as being "very nearly in the words of Josephus".

The inscription uses three terms referring to temple architecture:

 To hieron (Το ἱερόν), "holy place", the sacred area, to which the forecourt led
 Peribolou (περίβολος), a wall encompassing the holy terrace within the outer court
 Tryphaktou (τρύφακτος), a stone barrier across the outer court

Translation

The tablet bears the following inscription in Koine Greek:

Forgeries

Several forgeries were promptly prepared following the 1871 discovery. Clermont-Ganneau was shown a similar artifact at the Monastery of St Saviour, which was later shown to be a forgery created by Martin Boulos.

See also
Acts 21:27–29

References

External references

 Millard, Alan, Discoveries from the Time of Jesus. Oxford: Lion Publishing, 1990.
 Roitman, Aldopho, Envisioning the Temple, Jerusalem: The Israel Museum, 2003.
 Elias J. Bickerman, "The Warning Inscriptions of Herod's Temple," The Jewish Quarterly Review, New Ser., Vol. 37, No. 4. (Apr., 1947), pp. 387–405.
 Matan Orian, "The Purpose of the Balustrade in the Herodian Temple," Journal for the Study of Judaism 51 (2020), pp. 1–38.

1st-century BC inscriptions
1st-century inscriptions
1871 archaeological discoveries
Second Temple
Roman-era Greek inscriptions
Archaeological artifacts
Judaic inscriptions